Saint-Sulpice is a former commune in the Maine-et-Loire department in western France. On 1 January 2016, it was merged into the new commune of Blaison-Saint-Sulpice. Its population was 201 in 2019.

See also
Communes of the Maine-et-Loire department

References

Saintsulpice